Lorenz Frølich (25 October 182025 October 1908) was a Danish painter, illustrator, graphic artist and etcher.

Early life and education
Frølich was born into a wealthy bourgeouis family in Copenhagen. The son of Johan Jacob Frølich (1777-1858) and Pouline Wilhelmine Tutein (1789-1881). His father owned a successful trading firm in partnership with his brother. His mother was the daughter of Friederich Tutein, another wealthy whole-seller and the Prussian consul in Copenhagen. Frølich's father and uncle owned the building at Store Kongensgade 81. He lived with his parents in the apartment on the first floor. The uncle lived with his wife in the ground-floor apartment. The family belonged to the city's German reformed congregation.

Frølich was fond of drawing from an early age. Another early influence was his father's maternal uncle, Johan Conrad Spengler, who in his capacity of inspector of Kunstkammeret was able to give him access to the royal galleries in Christiansborg Palace. He received instructions in drawing from Martinus Rørbye from 1833 and later also from Christen Købke and Christoffer Wilhelm Eckersberg.

He later continued his training abroad, first in Dresden under Eduard Julius Bendemann (1843–1846) and then in Paris under Thomas Couture (1852–1853).

Career

Afterward he lived much in Rome and in Paris, where he constantly exhibited at the salons. In 1877 he was appointed professor at the Royal Danish Academy of Art, Copenhagen. His illustrations, especially of children's books, are known everywhere and are more important than his paintings. His daughter Edma Frølich was his favorite model when a baby and a child for his French albums with Pierre-Jules Hetzel.

He painted a decoration in the Court of Appeals at Flensburg, Schleswig-Holstein, and in some public buildings of his native land.

Danish painter and tapestry artist Dagmar Olrik (1860–1932) and her assistants spent 18 years decorating a room in Copenhagen's City Hall with tapestries based on cartoons of Nordic mythology by Frølich.

Personal life
In 1855, he married Carolina (Lina) Charlotta in de Betou (1823–1872). They were the parents of painter Edma Frølich (1859–1958).

Lorenz Frølich died in 1908 in Hellerup, Denmark.

Paintings
 King Harald Bluetooth (1840)
 Cupid and the Water-Sprite (1845, Leipzig Museum)
 Family of a Wood-God

References

External links

The Lord's Prayer, Illustrated in a series of Etchings, 1863.
Illustrations for Nordens Guder (Nordic Gods) by Adam Oehlenschläger, 1885.
Illustrations for Den Ældre Eddas Gudesange by Karl Gjellerup, 1895.
 
 
Eight stories illustrated by Lorenz Frølich in the Baldwin Library, University of Florida 
 MyNDIR (My Norse Digital Image repository) illustrations by Lorenz Frølich from Den Ældre Eddas Gudesange. Clicking on the thumbnail will give you the full image and information concerning it.
 

1820 births
1908 deaths
People from Gentofte Municipality
19th-century Danish painters
Danish male painters
Danish illustrators
19th-century illustrators of fairy tales
Academic staff of the Royal Danish Academy of Fine Arts
19th-century Danish male artists